Jomda County, is a county of the Chamdo Prefecture in  the Tibet Autonomous Region.

Administrative divisions
Jomda is divided in 2 towns and 11 townships.
 
Gamtog Town
 
 
 
 
 
 
 
 
 
Tongpu Township
 Bolo Township

Transport 
China National Highway 317

See also 
Banggaidoi

References 

Counties of Tibet
Chamdo